The 2006 Madrid Masters (also known as the Mutua Madrileña Masters Madrid for sponsorship reasons) was a tennis tournament played on indoor hard courts. It is the 5th edition of the Madrid Masters, and is part of the ATP Masters Series of the 2006 ATP Tour. It took place at the Madrid Arena in Madrid, Spain, from October 16 through October 23, 2006. First-seeded Roger Federer won the singles title.

The singles field was led by World No. 1,  Australian Open, Wimbledon and  U.S. Open, Indian Wells, Miami, Toronto Masters champion Roger Federer, ATP No. 2, French Open, Madrid defending champion, Monte Carlo and Rome winner Rafael Nadal, and Chennai, Zagreb and Vienna titlist  Ivan Ljubičić. Other top seeds were Estoril champion and 2005 Masters Cup winner David Nalbandian, New Haven and Kremlin Cup titlist Nikolay Davydenko, Andy Roddick, Tommy Robredo and James Blake.

Finals

Singles

 Roger Federer defeated  Fernando González 7–5, 6–1, 6–0
It was Roger Federer's 10th title of the year and his 43rd overall. It was his 4th Masters Series title of the year and his 12th overall.

Doubles

 Bob Bryan /  Mike Bryan defeated  Mark Knowles /  Daniel Nestor 7–5, 6–4

References

External links
 Official website
 Singles draw
 Doubles draw

 

 
2006 ATP Tour
2006 in Spanish tennis